Yang Rong is the name of:

 Yang Rong (businessman) (born 1957), Chinese businessman
 Yang Rong (actress) (born 1981), Chinese actress
 Yang Rong (mandarin) (1371–1440), Chinese scholar-official during the Ming dynasty